was a fudai feudal domain of Edo period Japan. The domain was centered at Kanō Castle, located in what is now part of the city of Gifu in Gifu Prefecture.

History
Before the Battle of Sekigahara, the central Mino Province was ruled by Oda Hidenobu, Oda Nobunaga's grandson, from his base at Gifu Castle. However, as Hidenobu sided with Ishida Mitsunari at the Battle of Sekigahara, his territory was confiscated by Tokugawa Ieyasu. In 1601, Ieyasu granted the area to his son-in-law Okudaira Nobumasa. Okudaira Nobumasa was allowed to build Kanō Castle with materials from the dismantled Gifu Castle. This was the birth of the Kanō Domain.

Nobumasa's placement at Kanō was meant to act as a check against the potentially hostile lords of western Japan, who might have wanted to march eastward against Ieyasu. Nobumasa retired in 1602, handing over the position of daimyō to his son Okudaira Tadamasa; however, he retained 40,000 of the domain's 100,000 koku as a "retirement fund", and continued to hold actual power, establishing a system of flood control and aiding in the setup of the castletown. Nobumasa and Tadamasa died in quick succession; the third Okudaira lord of Kanō, Tadataka, died heirless in 1632, and so Okudaira rule in Kanō came to an end.

Kanō was then given to the Ōkubo clan, with a reduced kokudaka of 50,000 koku from 1632-1639. Ōkubo Tadamoto was transferred from Kisai Domain in Musashi Province (which was dissolved as a result) and subsequently swapped places with the Matsudaira-Toda clan of Akashi Domain in Harima Province.

Under the Toda (1639-1711), the domain had a rated kokudaka of 70,000 koku. The Toda ruled until their transfer to Yodo Domain in Yamashiro Province in 1711. They were followed by the Andō clan from Bitchu-Matsuyama Domain (1711-1756), initially at 65,000 koku, but later reduced to 50,000 koku due to misrule before they were transferred to Iwakitaira Domain in Mutsu Province.

The Nagai clan, from Iwatsuki Domain in Musashi Province, ruled from 1756 until the Meiji restoration, with a kokudaka reduced to 32,000 koku. The 4th Nagai daimyō, Nagai Naosuke, served the Tokugawa shogunate as a wakadoshiyori, as did the final daimyō, Nagai Naokoto. During the Boshin War, the domain organized a surrender to Iwakura Tomomi without a fight.

After the Meiji restoration, Nagai Naokoto served as Domain governor until the abolition of the han system in 1871, and later received the kazoku peerage title of viscount.

Bakumatsu period holdings
As with most domains in the han system, Kanō Domain consisted of a discontinuous territories calculated to provide the assigned kokudaka, based on periodic cadastral surveys and projected agricultural yields.

Mino Province
21 villages in Atsumi District
Kawachi Province
5 villages in Matta District
1 village in [[Katano District, Osaka{Katano District]]
Settsu Province
5 villages in Shimashimo District 
8 villages in Shimakami District

List of daimyō

References

External links
  Kano on "Edo 300 HTML"] 

Domains of Japan
1600 establishments in Japan
History of Gifu Prefecture
Mino Province
Ōkubo clan
Okudaira clan
Toda-Matsudaira clan